Chiras may refer to:

Chiras, Afghanistan, a major village and valley in northern Afghanistan
Mihaela Chiras (born 1984), Romanian luger

See also
Chira (disambiguation)